Jacinto Brito Villegas (9 April 1938 – 1 September 1968) was a Mexican cyclist. He competed in the individual road race and team pursuit events at the 1960 Summer Olympics.

References

External links
 

1938 births
1968 deaths
Mexican male cyclists
Olympic cyclists of Mexico
Cyclists at the 1960 Summer Olympics
Sportspeople from Mexico City
Pan American Games medalists in cycling
Pan American Games bronze medalists for Mexico
Cyclists at the 1963 Pan American Games